Three ships of the United States Navy have been named USS Toledo for Toledo, Ohio:

 The first  was a patrol frigate that was renamed  in 1943.
 The second  was a  heavy cruiser active during the Korean War.
 The third  is a  still in service as of 2020.

United States Navy ship names